Harnawa is a village in Parbatsar Tehsil of Nagaur district in the Indian state of Rajasthan.

The village situated midway between Degana railway station and Parbatsar towns Near Gachhipura railway station.

Geography

How to reach Harnawa

Harnawa can be reached from Parbatsar - Piplod - Kanwlad - Janjila - Badu - Harnawa and another way from Parbatsar is Parbatsar - Huldhani - Badu - Harnawa. One can also come from Merta City - Bherunda - Harsore - Bhakri - Harnawa.
From Jaipur, Harnawa can be reached via Kishangarh.

Demographics

 India census, Harnawa had a population of 5,034. Males constitute 2527 of the population and females 2507.

References 

Villages in Nagaur district